The 2018–19 Dhaka Second Division Football League was held in 2019 from 24 March to 17 May. It is the 4th tier football league in Bangladesh founded 2015 by the Bangladesh Football Federation. Twelve teams participate in the league. Somaj Kallyan KS Mugda were promoted to Senior Division League as champion, with East End Club and Dilkusha Sporting Club following as second and third place holders.

Teams
There were thirteen teams that participated in the league.
 
Somaj Kallyan KS Mugda
Tongi Krira Chakra
Purbachal Parisad
AFC Uttara 
Little Friends Club
City Club
East End Club
BG Press S&RC
Shantinagar Sporting Club
Dilkusha SC      
Bangladesh Krira Shikkha Protishthan
Khilgaon Sporting Club
Gouripur Sporting Club

References

Dhaka Second Division Football League
2020 in Bangladeshi football